The Kent County Sheriff's Office (KCSO) is the primary law enforcement agency servicing a population of 19,983 people within  of jurisdiction within Kent County located on Maryland's eastern shore.

History
The KCSO was created in 1648 with Henry Morgan appointed as the first sheriff.

Organization
Nationally accredited by the Commission on Accreditation for Law Enforcement Agencies, the KCSO is full-service organization. The current sheriff of the KCSO is John F. Price IV. The agency is sub-divided into six units:
Administrative
Victim Services
School Resource
Patrol Division- within the Patrol Division, there are three units:
K-9 Unit
Community Policing Unit
Bicycle Patrol Unit
Services Division
Kent Bureau of Investigation

See also 

 List of law enforcement agencies in Maryland

References

Further reading 
 
 
 

Sheriff's Office
Sheriffs' offices of Maryland
1648 establishments in Maryland